BusCaracas is a bus rapid transit system that serves Caracas, the capital of Venezuela. The system opened to the public in October 2012
, covering San José de Cotiza, La Bandera and El Cementerio. Other lines have been added gradually over the next several years.

Stations 
Las Flores
Panteón
Socorro
La Hoyada (With transfer to line 1 of Caracas Metro)
El Cristo
Roca Tarpeya
Presidente Medina
El INCES
Roosevelt
La Bandera (With transfer to line 3 of Caracas Metro)
Los Ilustres

References

Transport in Caracas
Bus rapid transit